Statistics of American Soccer League II in season 1981.

League standings

ASL All-Stars

Playoffs

Bracket

1st Round

Semifinals

Championship final

Post season awards
Most Valuable Player:  Billy Boljevic, NY Eagles
Coach of the year:  Jimmy McGeough, NY United 
Rookie of the year:  Tony Suarez, Carolina
Executive of the Year:  Robert Benson, Carolina

References

American Soccer League II (RSSSF)

American Soccer League (1933–1983) seasons
2